Daji was the favourite consort of King Zhou of Shang, the last king of the Shang dynasty in ancient China. In legends and fictions, she is portrayed as a malevolent fox spirit who kills and impersonates the real Daji. Her identification as a fox spirit seems to have originated from at least the Tang dynasty. She is considered a classic example of how a beautiful femme fatale can cause the downfall of a dynasty in Chinese culture.

In the Song dynasty, fox spirit cults, including those dedicated to Daji, became outlawed, but their suppression was unsuccessful. For example, in 1111, an imperial edict was issued for the destruction of many spirit shrines within Kaifeng, including those of Daji.

Biography

Daji was from a noble family of Yousu; her style name is Da, and her clan name is Ji. Hence, she is also known as Su Da Ji or Da Ji in ancient sources. At some time during his early reign, King Zhou of Shang invaded Yousu and took Daji as his prize.

King Zhou became extremely infatuated with Daji and started to neglect state affairs in order to keep her company. He used any means necessary to ingratiate himself with her and please her. Daji liked animals, so he built her a zoological garden with several rare species of birds and animals. In addition, he ordered musicians to compose and choreograph lewd music to satisfy her musical tastes. He also constructed his "pond of alcohol" and "forest of meat" specifically for Daji. At one point, King Zhou gathered 3000 guests to his wine lake. He allowed the guests to play the cat and mouse game nude in the forest to amuse Daji. When one of King Zhou's concubines, the daughter of Lord Jiu, protested, King Zhou had her executed. Her father was ground in pieces, and his flesh fed to King Zhou's vassals.

Daji also enjoyed torture and executions, and would reportedly laugh at every execution. According to stories, she also appeared to be quick to torture. At one point, she noticed a farmer walking across ice barefoot, and so she ordered his feet cut off to understand why he was resistant to low temperatures. In another story, Daji had a pregnant woman's belly cut open so that she could find out herself what happened inside. Bi Gan, King Zhou's uncle, reportedly received an unfortunate end at Daji's hands by having his heart cut out and examined to determine if the ancient saying of "a good man's heart has seven apertures" was true.

Daji was best known for her invention of a method of torture known as the Bronze Toaster. This is described as a bronze cylinder covered with oil heated like a furnace with charcoal beneath until its sides were extremely hot. The victim was forced to walk on top of the slowly heating cylinder, and he was forced to shift his feet in order to not burn. The oily surface made it difficult for the victim to maintain their balance, and if the victim fell into the charcoal below, they would be burnt to death.

Daji was executed on the orders of King Wu of Zhou after the fall of the Shang dynasty on the advice of Jiang Ziya. The Grand Historian, Sima Qian, only briefly mentions Daji and her execution, that King Zhou had listened only to Daji, and that she was killed after King Zhou. According to Han scholar Liu Xiang's Biographies of Exemplary Women, following her death, her head was hung on a small white flag to symbolize how she had become the downfall of the dynasty. She had become King Wu's excuse for taking over the kingdom, and, as such, the government was renewed following her death. Other sources state that she committed suicide by strangulation.

Daji as a mythical fox 
From the Southern and Northern Dynasties period on, Daji was believed to be an incarnation of a nine-tailed fox.

Daji had many shrines associated with her in fox form. The shrines dedicated to her were considered illicit cults and as such, banned.

While not related directly to one source, the creation of foot binding is associated with Daji as well. It is said that Daji created foot binding to hide her fox feet. As the other women did not know why she wrapped her feet, the other ladies at court imitated her.

Literature

Daji is featured in the Chinese novel  as a major antagonist. She was the first featured corrupter of the declining Shang dynasty in the novel. She was summoned by Nu Wa, the celestial sovereign, to destroy King Zhou. In return, Nu Wa promised immortality after her mission was finished (Harvard wku). In , she was a daughter of Su Hu; in the early chapters, she was killed by a thousand-year-old vixen spirit who possessed her body before becoming a concubine of King Zhou. Her father Su Hu gave her to King Zhou of Shang as an appeasement offer after armed conflict broke out between Su's and Shang military forces.

One night before, Daji was sent to the capital city of Zhaoge, and she was possessed by an evil nine-tailed fox spirit (aka Thousand-Year-Old Vixen). When Daji arrived in Zhaoge, she became the center of attention of King Zhou and caused the king to be extremely obsessed with her. King Zhou neglected state affairs to keep her company and ignored the advice of his subjects. Yunzhongzi was the first man to act against Daji by giving the king a magical peach-wood sword which would make Daji ill and kill her eventually. She rose above the ranks from a minor concubine to become the queen based on the king's favouritism towards her.

Daji was blamed for the fall of the Shang dynasty by corrupting King Zhou and causing him to neglect state affairs and rule with tyranny and despotism. This ultimately led to the dynasty's decline and widespread chaos. King Zhou's tyranny incurred the anger and resentment of the common people, who eventually rose up in revolt against him under King Wu of Zhou's leadership. After the fall of the Shang dynasty, Daji was exorcised by Jiang Ziya (aka Jiang Taigong) and died eventually.

In , Daji is paranoid about others finding out her secret of being a fox. As such, she escalates to violence and kills until the king is the only one who does not know. In most literature involving Daji, there is some reason as to why she cannot be killed in human form since she is too beautiful. In , a magical weapon is required to kill her. In , a mirror is used to expose and destroy her. In this piece of literature, Daji's true form was a nine-tailed fox with a woman's face.

In , a Ming dynasty novel, Daji is a fox spirit who leaves heaven. She was unhappy after her time on earth, so she left again for the earth to make a fox kingdom.

See also
Bo Yikao
Femme fatale
Jade Pipa
Jiutou Zhiji Jing
Nüwa
Tamamo-no-Mae

References

Sources
 Chen, Ya-chen - Women in Chinese martial arts films of the new millennium narrative analyses and gender politics (2012) - 
 Epstein, Maram - Competing discourses: Orthodoxy, authenticity, and endangered meanings in late Imperial Chinese fiction (2001) - 
 Huntington, Rania - Alien kind: foxes and late imperial Chinese narrative (2003) - 
 Kang, Xiaofei - The cult of the fox: Power, gender, and popular religion in late imperial and modern China (2006) - .
 Lin, Fu-shih - Modern Chinese Religion I - .
 Xu, Zhonglin - Fengshen Yanyi (16th century)

11th-century BC Chinese people
11th-century BC Chinese women
Chinese royal consorts
Investiture of the Gods characters
Shang dynasty people